Macalla eumictalis is a species of snout moth in the genus Macalla.
This moth is known from Sri Lanka and India.

The adults have a wingspan of 34mm for the males and 40mm for the females.

References

Epipaschiinae
Moths described in 1912